Stephen Dotse Koblah Ahialey (born 8 January 1970) is a Ghanaian boxer. He competed in the 1992 Summer Olympics.

References

1970 births
Living people
Boxers at the 1992 Summer Olympics
Ghanaian male boxers
Olympic boxers of Ghana
Boxers from Accra
Light-flyweight boxers